Allister Majola is a South African cricketer. He made his first-class debut for KwaZulu-Natal Inland in the 2017–18 Sunfoil 3-Day Cup on 23 November 2017.

References

External links
 

Year of birth missing (living people)
Living people
South African cricketers
KwaZulu-Natal Inland cricketers
Place of birth missing (living people)